Priyome is a Russian noun that is used directly and generically in English to represent some sort of typical maneuver or technique in chess. For example, a typical defensive technique in rook endings is to use the king to attack the opponent's pawns. 

In Russian, приём is a common word with various meanings including "reception", "acceptance" and "gimmick", and is used in contexts as diverse as music, literature, computer science, and martial arts. It is also very common in Russian chess literature to refer to typical maneuvers used in positions with certain pawn structures or other defining characteristics.  Because the word does not have an exact equivalent in English—with "device", "technique", or "method" the closest translations—it has appeared untranslated in English-language chess literature, although this usage is not yet widespread.

Examples
A Russian movie, Buket Na Priyome, is a crime drama highlighting the technique as a theme and tactic. A famous game by Garry Kasparov in Nicaragua has been used by training academies to illustrate the technique. After e4–e5 in the first diagram below, the d- is potentially open, and thus a candidate to be controlled by White's rooks:

References

External links

 64 Commandments of Chess by Bruce Pandolfini
 Chess Strategy, Second Edition and Chess and Checkers: the Way to Mastership, both by Edward Lasker
 The Blue Book of Chess; "Teaching the Rudiments of the Game, and Giving an Analysis of All the Recognized Openings" by Howard Staunton
 Chess Strategy, free lessons on basic elements.

Chess terminology